Jason Matthew Rayner (born 14 September 1966) is an English journalist and food critic. He was raised in Harrow, London, and studied politics at the University of Leeds, where he edited the Leeds Student newspaper. After graduating, he worked as a freelance journalist for newspapers including The Observer and The Independent on Sunday. He became the Observer restaurant critic in 1999. Rayner has also written several books.

Early life
Rayner was born on 14 September 1966. He is the younger son of Desmond Rayner and journalist Claire Rayner. His family is Jewish. He was raised in the Sudbury Hill area of Harrow, London, and attended the independent Haberdashers' Aske's Boys' School. He studied politics at the University of Leeds, where he was editor of the Leeds Student newspaper, graduating in 1988.

Career
Rayner worked as a freelance journalist after graduating, writing for newspapers including The Observer and The Independent on Sunday. In 1992, he was named Young Journalist of the Year in the British Press Awards. He worked as a feature writer for The Guardian, The Mail on Sunday, and The Observer before becoming the Observer restaurant critic in 1999. In 2020, during the COVID-19 pandemic, when many restaurants were forced to close, Rayner announced he would not publish negative reviews. He wrote: "That doesn't mean giving good reviews to bad places, or not including criticisms. It just means that if I can't be generally positive, I won't review and will move on."

Rayner has also written for magazines including GQ, Esquire, Cosmopolitan, the New Statesman and Granta. His first novel, The Marble Kiss, published in 1994, was shortlisted for the Author's Club First Novel Award and his second, Day of Atonement (1998) was shortlisted for the Jewish Quarterly Prize for Fiction. His first non-fiction book, Stardust Falling, was published in 2002; this was followed by his third novel The Apologist, published in the US as Eating Crow, in 2004.

In 1997 he won a Sony Radio Award for Papertalk, BBC Radio Five Live's magazine programme about the newspaper business, which he presented. He chairs a BBC Radio 4 programme called The Kitchen Cabinet.

Rayner was one of the panel of critics who made up the "enemy" on the daytime cookery show Eating with the Enemy, and performs a similar role on the UK version of MasterChef. He is the food reporter on the BBC magazine programme The One Show, and was on the panel of judges on the American programme Top Chef Masters. He appeared as a guest judge on the "UK" episode of The Final Table, season 1.

Rayner hosts the Out to Lunch podcast in which he interviews a celebrity guest in each episode.

Personal life 
He was awarded the title Beard of the Year for 2011 by the Beard Liberation Front. He plays piano with his jazz ensemble the Jay Rayner Quartet.

Books

Fiction 
 The Marble Kiss (1994), 
 Day of Atonement (1998), 
 The Apologist (2004), 
The Oyster House Siege (2007),

Non-fiction 
 Star Dust Falling (2002), 
 The Man Who Ate the World (2008), 
 My Dining Hell: Twenty Ways to Have a Lousy Night Out (2012), 
 A Greedy Man in a Hungry World (2014), 
 The Ten (Food) Commandments (2016), 
 Wasted Calories and Ruined Nights (2018), a collection of some of Rayner's negative reviews 
 My Last Supper (2019),

Awards 
Restaurant Critic Of The Year, Glenfiddich Food and Drink Awards (2001)
Critic Of The Year, British Press Awards (2006)

References

External links 
 
Gourmet Traveller interview "A Bite With the Man Who Ate The World"

1966 births
Living people
People from the London Borough of Harrow
People educated at Haberdashers' Boys' School
Alumni of the University of Leeds
English male journalists
British restaurant critics
English Jews
English television presenters
English television personalities
20th-century English novelists
21st-century English novelists
English male novelists
20th-century English male writers
21st-century English male writers
English republicans